Kyanda is a rural locality (a village) in Pokrovskoye Rural Settlement of Onezhsky District, Arkhangelsk Oblast, Russia. The population was 120 as of 2010. There are 3  streets.

Geography 
Kyanda is located 54 km north of Onega (the district's administrative centre) by road. Tamitsa is the nearest rural locality.

References 

Rural localities in Onezhsky District
Onezhsky Uyezd